Central Polytechnic Chennai is a polytechnic in Tamil Nadu.

History
The institution was started in 1916 under the name and style of the “Madras Trades School” for imparting training to apprentices in mechanical engineering and plumbing, with an intake of 20 trainees in each course.  Gradually, the numbers of courses conducted were increased and also correspondingly admission capacity rose.  In 1931, the name of the school was changed to “The Government School of Technology” and courses in mechanical and electrical engineering were recognized and made full time courses leading to the award of a diploma. In the year 1946, the name of the Institution was changed to “The Central Polytechnic College”.  In the beginning, the Madras Trade school was functioning in a rented building and in the course of time, a separate building was constructed and the institution moved to its own building at Broadway, where it stayed through the academic year 1957-1958. During 1958-1959 the institution moved to Guindy near the industrial estate.  Since the land available in Guindy was not sufficient to construct additional buildings, and to create additional infrastructure for further development, lands to the extent of 40 hectares initially and further 3221 hectares were acquired in the present premises where the Polytechnic is functioning presently. Central Polytechnic College was selected on the basis of merit for the implementation of TEQIP and this Institution is functioning under a block grant system with effect since 1 October 2008.

Mission

Central Polytechnic College offers high quality diploma certificate level technical engineering and need based, skill-oriented programmes through full–time, part-time and continuing education to expand and partnerships with industries, business, higher learning educational institutions and local bodies for mutual development through relevant training programmes. It develops, enhances and standardizes the competencies of the staff through pedagogical, skill development and industrial exposure in co-ordination with net working institutions for the benefit of student’s community in placements. The institution as a whole believes in quality through excellence, accessibility and high ethical, moral standards while adopting a participatory and transparent approach in all its activities.

Vision
The institution aims to offer technical education to eligible candidates to make available competent technician force to industry and organization with a focus on economical and social uplift of the community by full-time, part-time diploma and post diploma programs in specific area of engineering and technology by optimum utilization of infrastructure, human resources, linkage with industries and strives for academic excellence.

Principal's Message
Graduated in Civil engineering in the year 1987 from  Coimbatore Institute of Technology, Coimbatore. He joined in the department of civil engineering in November 1988. He has served in various position and additionally he carried out extracurricular activities like “continuing education” manage for World Bank assisted Polytechnic  programs for 5 years. He was charge of NSS Program. Ne did his M.Tech Structural Engineering at Vellore Institute of Technology, Vellore. He was honored by the president of India Shri Pranab Mukerjee with Gold Medal for the first rank academic performance during the year 2006. He served as Controller of Examination for a period of 5 years Central Polytechnic College. He did hid Doctoral Degree in Structural Engineering at Guindy. He interested in improving curricular activities and other infrastructural development in our college.

Departments 

 Civil engineering - 3 years
 Computer Engineering - 3 years
 Mechanical engineering - 3 years
 Marine Engineering - 3 years
 Electrical and electronics engineering - 3 years
 Electronics and communications engineering - 3 years
 Mechanical engineering (Sandwich) - 3 1/2 years
 Fisherish technology - 3 1/2 years
 Marine engineering - 3 years

Canada India Institutional Cooperation Project
The Canada India Institutional Cooperation Project is a major Human Resource Development Project launched during the year 1991 through a Memorandum of Understanding signed between the Govt. of Canada and the Govt. of India. The main objective of the Project is to train the staff of the Polytechnic Colleges to improve the quality and enhance the quantum of the human resource potential and to achieve development in Polytechnic Education System.

The project was initially funded by the Canadian International Development Agency and initiatives formulated and executed jointly by the Association of Canadian Community Colleges and the Ministry of Human Resource Development, Govt. of India. When the project came to an end on 31 March 1999, the State Project Coordination Unit was formed to take steps to achieve holistic development in Polytechnic Education System.

At present, 105 polytechnic colleges are participating in this program. Various job-oriented, need-based training programs are offered by the Canada India Institutional Cooperation Project Polytechnic Colleges under Continuing Education Programs. It now offers short-term courses in:

 Auto CAD-2D
 CNC Machines
 Programmable logic controllers
 Supervisory control and data acquisition
 MS Office 2010
 Statistical Quality Control / Statistical Process Control
 Total Quality Management and ISO 9000
 Basic Principle of Town Planning
 Four-wheeler Driving Practice
 Embedded System – 1
 Embedded System – 2
 Refrigeration and Air Condition
 TAHDCO (HUDCO)
 Hardware and networking
 Cell phone and service

The revenue generated through the various programmes of CIICP is to be utilized for Institution development.

References
 Central Polytechnic College, Information Bulletin 2010-2011

External links
 Directorate of Technical Education, Tamil Nadu 
 Official website 
 Facebook Fan page 

Universities and colleges in Chennai